The Royal County of Berkshire Show is an annual agricultural show in Berkshire, England that started in 1909 at Enborne Gate Farm, Newbury, as a horse show and has now grown to be a significant event for the farming world.

The Newbury and District Agricultural Society was formed in 1909 to run the show and continues to do so. 

There were four breaks overall when no show took place: between 1914 and 1918 during the First World War, between 1928 and 1935 during the farming Depression, during the Second World War from 1939 to 1945 & 2020 on grounds of COVID-19 pandemic. Since then the Show has grown to become one of the leading agricultural shows in the country.

The show takes place over two days in September at the permanent showground near Chieveley.

References

External links

Agricultural shows in England
September events
Events in Berkshire
Festivals established in 1909
1909 establishments in England
Autumn events in England
Summer events in the United Kingdom